Gerald W. Ward (born September 6, 1941) is an American former professional basketball player.

A 6'4" (1.93 m) guard, Ward starred at Boston College from 1960 to 1963. He scored 1,112 points over the course of his collegiate career, and grabbed 947 rebounds. As a senior, he was an All-American third team selection and an Academic All-American first team honoree.

Ward was selected by the St. Louis Hawks with the fifth pick of the 1963 NBA draft. He played four seasons in the NBA with the Hawks, Boston Celtics, Philadelphia 76ers, and Chicago Bulls, averaging 3.2 points per game.

In 2007, Boston College retired Ward's #40 jersey.

References

1941 births
Living people
American men's basketball players
Basketball players from New York City
Boston Celtics players
Boston College Eagles men's basketball players
Cardinal Hayes High School alumni
Chicago Bulls expansion draft picks
Chicago Bulls players
Philadelphia 76ers players
San Diego Rockets expansion draft picks
Shooting guards
Sportspeople from the Bronx
St. Louis Hawks draft picks
St. Louis Hawks players